Taillebourg may refer to:

 Taillebourg, Charente-Maritime, a French commune
 Taillebourg, Lot-et-Garonne, a French commune of the Lot-et-Garonne department
 Battle of Taillebourg
 Château de Taillebourg